Sujatha is a 1980 Indian Tamil-language film directed by Vasudevan, starring Vijayan, Shankar, Saritha, Sukumari, Rajalakshmi, Vanitha Krishnachandran, Major Sundarrajan and Raveendran. It is a remake of the Malayalam film Shalini Ente Koottukari.

Plot summary

Sujatha is the story of a brother and sister, played by Shankar and Saritha respectively. Shankar commits suicide to stop the forced marriage initiated by their father Major Sundarrajan, as she does not want to marry. The film shows light in Saritha's life, when she meets a new college lecturer Vijayan.

Cast

Vijayan
Shankar
Saritha
Major Sundarrajan
Sukumari
Sachu
Thengai Srinivasan
Nagesh
Manorama
Rajalakshmi
Vanitha Krishnachandran
Raveendran

Soundtrack 
Soundtrack was composed by M. S. Viswanathan.
"Nee Varuvaiyena" (F) - Kalyani Menon
"Nee Varuvaiyena" (M) - Jayachandran
"Nadai Alangaram" - SPB
"Engirintho Vantha Paravaigale" - P.Suseela
"Antharanga" - Jayachandran
Records:EMI EP Record (c) 1980

References

External links
 

1980 films
Indian drama films
Films scored by M. S. Viswanathan
Tamil remakes of Malayalam films
1980s Tamil-language films
1980 drama films